
Gmina Wielkie Oczy is a rural gmina (administrative district) in Lubaczów County, Subcarpathian Voivodeship, in south-eastern Poland, on the border with Ukraine.

Villages
Gmina Wielkie Oczy contains the villages and settlements of Bihale, Czopy, Dumy, Gieregi, Kobylnica Ruska, Kobylnica Wołoska, Łukawiec, Majdan Lipowiecki, Mielnik, Niwa, Podłozy, Potok Jaworowski, Skolin, Sople, Szczeble, Tarnawskie, Wielkie Oczy, Wola, Wólka Żmijowska, Zagrobla and Żmijowiska.

Neighbouring gminas
Gmina Wielkie Oczy is bordered by the gminas of Laszki and Radymno. It also borders Ukraine.

References

Polish official population figures 2006

Wielkie Oczy
Lubaczów County